Astragalus preussii (common name - Preuss’ milkvetch) is an annual or perennial plant in the legume family (Fabaceae) found in the Colorado Plateau and Canyonlands region of the southwestern United States.

Description

Growth pattern

Leaves and stems

Inflorescence and fruit
It blooms from March to June.
When dried,  seed pods are papery or leathery, elliptical, and are either smooth or covered with soft hairs.

Habitat and range
It only grows in soils containing Selenium.

Ecological and human interactions
It is named after Charles Preuss.

References

preussii
Flora of the Southwestern United States
Perennial plants
Flora of the Western United States
Flora without expected TNC conservation status